Melinda Jane Messenger (born 23 February 1971) is an English television presenter and former glamour model and Page Three girl. She presented the magazine programme Live from Studio Five and was formerly the co-presenter of the reality show Cowboy Builders.

Early life
Messenger was born in Swindon, Wiltshire. After attending different schools, one of which was Dorcan Technology College, she spent six months working as a flight attendant for Britannia Airways. She then joined a local marketing company and rose to become customer services manager, overseeing a staff of 50 employees.

Career

Modelling
Messenger decided to become a model, and was advised by the Jason Paul Modelling Agency to enhance her breasts, which she enlarged from a 34C to a 34DD cup. She then took a job modelling for a Gloucester-based double glazing company, Glevum, dressed only in lingerie. As part of an advertising campaign called "Class Behind Glass", the posters quickly began disappearing from bus stops, having been taken by locals. After a complaint at the lack of clothes on Messenger, the Advertising Standards Authority banned the campaign, claiming they were not sufficiently "classy".

After local newspapers reported on this, the Daily Star ran the story on 28 January 1997 as a photo-shoot of Messenger, under the headline "Move Over Eva Herzigova". In 1997 she won Rear of the Year.

Signed by modelling agent Yvonne Paul, who had steered Samantha Fox to fame in the 1980s, Messenger's career accelerated. She posed for designers including Vivienne Westwood, then appeared on The Sun newspaper's Page Three; the publication later hailed her as the "Girl of the Thrillenium!". Her work for the newspaper entailed visiting the Spanish coasts and English seaside resorts, an assignment known as "Mel's Big Bus Tour". She continued working for The Sun until readers voted to ban models with breast implants.

Move from modelling
Messenger appeared in a cameo role in 1999's Virtual Sexuality as Superbra Girl, and costarred in the 2000 cult film The Mumbo Jumbo in the role of Princess Vanilla. She worked on Channel 4 cult show Eurotrash and became a popular pantomime actress, taking on roles such as Cinderella (2004–2005) and Aladdin (with Bobby Davro and John Rhys-Davies; Woking – 2005–2006).

Motherhood and becoming a presenter
Following the birth of her first child on 7 April 2000, by emergency caesarian section after she collapsed with pre-eclampsia, Messenger concentrated on developing her career as a television presenter.

Messenger released her Back into Shape Workout DVD, which was a six-week fitness programme designed to help new mothers recover their fitness. She appeared on Noel Edmonds – Gotcha! in which she was one of the subjects to receive the treatment from Noel and his team.

Messenger had her own issue of At Home With... magazine called "At Home With Melinda Messenger", which was aimed at parents. She joined with chef Antony Worrall Thompson in May 2008 and contributed some recipes for the cookbook The Sweet Life.

Television

Messenger's TV career began in 1997 on Channel 4's Eurotrash, where she featured as a "roving reporter" in erotic scenarios, including modelling fetish wear and acting as a nude magician's assistant.

In 1998–99 she hosted her own show on Channel 5 called Melinda's Big Night In.

From 1998 to 2001, Messenger became an assistant on game show Fort Boyard which ran for four series on Channel 5. She joined ex-Eastender Leslie Grantham and Catweazle star Geoffrey Bayldon in the game show which tested contestants' physical agility and brainpower on the sea fortress in France.

In 2002, she appeared on Celebrity Big Brother. She has since presented many TV programmes, including Loose Lips (with Richard Arnold), Baby Baby, Can We Still Be Friends, Beat The Dealer and Beat the Crusher.

In 2004, she appeared on the "Age Swap" episode of Celebrity Swap as 83-year-old Margaret Doyle, supposedly Melinda's old ballet teacher, disguised with prosthetic make-up, a black lycra suit, a red-white wig and fake teeth.

She and her family appeared on All Star Family Fortunes in 2006.
 
In 2008, Messenger presented as host on programmes including the BBC's To Buy or Not to Buy, ITV's Bingo Night Live, and A Garden For Eden for ITV Westcountry.

She did a voiceover for a viewer competition for ITV's Golden Balls between 2008 and 2009.

Messenger's show Cowboy Builders started on Five on 8 January 2009, co-presented with Dominic Littlewood. Alongside this, Melinda was a contestant in the fourth series of Dancing on Ice, which began on 11 January 2009. She was eliminated in the seventh week after losing a surprise skate-off against Jessica Taylor. She had survived three previous skate-offs.

In 2009, Messenger, along with ex-footballer Ian Wright and The Apprentice runner-up Kate Walsh began presenting a new show on Five called Live from Studio Five. The show ran continuously from September 2009 and until it was cancelled in February 2011. In November 2009, she appeared on the BBC charity telethon Children in Need, where she acted as the assistant to an illusionist act.

It was announced on 29 January 2010 that Messenger was leaving her role on Live from Studio Five, to focus on other projects. Her last show was on 26 February and she was replaced by a series of guest hosts. 

She hosted The Health Lottery Draws on ITV and Channel 5 between 2011 and 2012.

In January 2021, she appeared in a week's episodes of Richard Osman's House of Games.

Psychotherapist

After quitting regular television work, Messenger undertook training in psychotherapy and has practised since 2015.

Personal life
Having dated since they met at his local Swansea nightclub, Messenger married Wayne Roberts in Bali, Indonesia, on 26 November 1998. The couple have three children. Though Messenger expressed a desire for a large family, she decided not to have more children because she had suffered from post-natal depression after the birth of her second and third children. In 2003, Messenger won Quality Street "Celebrity Mum of the Year". Roberts runs an electronics company based in Swindon, of which Messenger is a director.  The couple separated in 2008 and again in 2012.

On 22 January 2009, Messenger was made an ambassador to Barnardo's by its president, Camilla, Duchess of Cornwall.

References

External links

Video Diary of trip to Malawi for the charity ActionAid

1971 births
Living people
English television presenters
Page 3 girls
People from Swindon
Television personalities from Wiltshire